Yanagiman is a Japanese musician, 
Dealing with composition, words, arrangement other than the produce of various artists including Ketumeishi、Funky Monkey Babys、Katou Miriya、Elephant Kashimashi and The Gospellers.
The genre diverges into many branches with Jazz, Rock, R & B, Folk, Hiphop, Classic.
In 1989, entering Berkeley College of Music of Massachusetts Boston. After returning home to Fukuoka acts as reporter on TV. Participate in recording and a tour of Date of Bath.
Afterwards goes to Tokyo and begin produce, arrangement of Soul lovers.
Getting to know Ketumeishi by an introduction from Mahya of Soul lovers begins to make a work with them.
In the country producing, perform a musical piece offer and arrangement to various artist as Ketumeishi, Funky Monkey Babys, Chemistries, Crystal Kay, Koda Kumi, Mika Nakajima, Katou Miriya, Elephant Kashimashi Boa, Def Tech, Hirahara Ayaka, and even a foreign territory performs musical piece offers Usher (Remix) who is artist playing an active part in the billboard scene. Also performs musical piece offers for Hong Kong singers Ivanwang, HotCha, Ella Koon,
Receiving a record award gold medal for BoA "Love Letter" in 2007
Winning the record award excellence Best Picture Award for Funky Monkey Babys "still I believed" in 2011. The number of shipment of the work concerned with reaches more than 20 million pieces of accumulation until now.

◆Produced Artist   ◆

Funky Monkey Babys
Ketumeishi
SMAP Katou Miliyah
Shimizu Shouta
BoA
Elephant Kashimashi
Kubota Toshinobu etc.

Artists Yanagiman has worked with
 BoA
 Crystal Kay
 Elephant Kashimashi
 hitomi
 Lisa
 Hitomi Shimatani
 SMAP
 Southern All Stars
 Sowelu
 Usher

References
 yanagiman.com (2006) yanagiman.com - Biography

External links
 yanagiman.com official web site
 Profile from Discogs

1960 births
Living people
Japanese musicians
Musicians from Kagoshima Prefecture